Miss Grand Brazil 2023 will be the fifth edition of the Miss Grand Brazil beauty pageant, scheduled to be held on June 29, 2023, at Hotel Sibara Flat & Conventions in Balneário Camboriú, Santa Catarina. Candidates chosen through either the state pageants or national preliminary casting held directly by a central licensee will compete for the title, the winner of whom will be crowned by Isabella Menin of Alto Cafezal, Miss Grand Brazil 2022, and will represent the country at Miss Grand International 2023, to be held in Vietnam on October 25.

Selection of contestants

Overview

As per the data collected in the regional pageants section below, seven contestants have been confirmed to participate, three of whom were the winners of the Miss Grand regional pageants (A1), including the representatives of Minas Gerais, Paraná, and Zona da Mata Mineira; the other two, the representatives of Santa Catarina and São Paulo, obtained the Miss Grand title as the supplementary award in Miss Brazil CNB's regional pageants (B1), and one, the representative of Pernambuco, was appointed after obtaining the runner-up title at the CNB state pageant (B2), while remaining one, Paraíba's representative, was appointed to the position without participating in the respective local pageant.

Regional pageants

Several Brazilian states organized Miss Grand state pageants separately to select representatives for the Miss Grand Brazil 2023 contest, such as Paraná, Minas Gerais, Sergipe; moreover, tertiary-level contests were also observed, such as Miss Grand Nova Iguaçu, with the winners representing their communities in the state-level pageants.

Candidates
As of March 2023, 17 delegates have been confirmed to participate.

 – Sarah Cristinny
 Cataratas do Iguacu – Bárbara David Vazquez
 – Victoria Melo
 Circuito das Frutas – Carina Manzi
 – Kelry Fernandes
 Guanabara – Nathália Salema
 Ilhabela – Bruna Sartori 
 – Hélen Gonçalves Larocca
 – Júlia Castro
 – Elen Guedes
 – Ana Finkler
 – Cinthya Moura
 – Maria Veloso
 – Suan Magnone
 – Fernanda Lupato
 – Caroline Valentino
 Zona da Mata Mineira – Adriana Yanca

References

External links

 
 Miss Grand Brazil official website

Miss Grand Brazil
Grand Brazil